The 1984 International cricket season was from May 1984 to September 1984.

Season overview

May

West Indies in England

August

Sri Lanka in England

References

1984 in cricket